The 1955 Coupe de France Final was a football match held on 29 May 1955 at the Stade Olympique Yves-du-Manoir in Colombes, France. It was the final of the 1954–55 edition of the Coupe de France. The match saw Lille defeat Bordeaux 5–2 thanks to goals by Jean Vincent, Yvon Douis (2), and Gérard Bourbotte (2).

Match details

See also
1954–55 Coupe de France

External links
Coupe de France results at Rec.Sport.Soccer Statistics Foundation
Report on French federation site

Coupe
1955
Coupe De France Final 1955
Coupe De France Final 1955
Sport in Hauts-de-Seine
May 1955 sports events in Europe
1955 in Paris